Giovani, belle... probabilmente ricche is a 1982 commedia sexy all'italiana film directed by Michele Massimo Tarantini and starring Carmen Russo and Nadia Cassini, most prominent stars of the genre in the early 1980s with Olinka Hardiman (credited as Olinka Link).

Plot
Claudia (Russo), Rita (Cassini), and Caterina (Hardiman) are three friends who live in a conservative Italian town and lead seemingly neat and respectable married lives. One day, they are summoned to the notary public's office and learn that Anna, one of their peers in high school who got a bad name as a "whore" in the town because of them and was forced to leave is now dead. Furthermore, she had amassed a great fortune abroad and decided to bequeath it to the three. However, she has a strange condition: Claudia, Rita, and Caterina should cheat on their husbands within three days and provide photographic evidence or else the inheritance will be donated to the retirement home. Claudia is already running a secret affair with Caterina's husband Gabriele (Michele Gammino) but has not considered that photographic evidence may be a problem in her plans whereas Caterina attempts to have sex with dim-witted Giacomo (Lucio Montanaro) she has been seducing for a while. On the other hand, Rita tells of the inheritance to her husband Filippo (Gianfranco D'Angelo) and greedy Filippo, incorrectly thinking that his wife will be too timid to accomplish the task, decides to intervene. As a result of the inevitable high jinks, the real face of the reputable town life and deeds of Claudia, Rita, and Caterina in particular will be exposed.

Cast
Carmen Russo: Claudia
Nadia Cassini: Rita
Olinka Hardiman: Caterina
Michele Gammino: Gabriele, Caterina's husband
Gianfranco D'Angelo: Filippo, Rita's husband 
Lucio Montanaro: Giacomo 
Sergio Leonardi: Alberto, Claudia's husband
Gianni Ciardo: Cellist Giovanni
Alessandra Canale: Gabriele's assistant

See also        
 List of Italian films of 1982

External links

1982 films
Commedia sexy all'italiana
Adultery in films
Films directed by Michele Massimo Tarantini
1980s sex comedy films
1982 comedy films
1980s Italian-language films
1980s Italian films